Rose Caylor (born Rose Libman, 15 March 1898 – March 1979) was a Russian-American screenwriter, playwright, actress, and journalist known for her work in the U.S. in the 1920s through the 1940s. She was married to filmmaker and journalist Ben Hecht.

Biography 
Rose was born into a Jewish family in Vilna, in what was then the Russian Empire. Her father, Morris Libman, emigrated to the U.S. in 1907, and Rose and her mother and sister followed the next year, settling in Chicago, Illinois.

Rose attended the University of Chicago and afterward began working at The Chicago Daily News, where she met her future husband, writer Ben Hecht. The pair moved to New York together in 1924, and married in 1926 after his divorce from his first wife was finalized. They'd have one daughter, actress Jenny Hecht.

Over the course of her career as a writer, she wrote a number of original stage plays and novels; she also authored the 1942 film noir Fingers at the Window. She appears to have worked on several films with her husband that she didn't receive credits on. She also translated plays from Russian into English for Broadway productions. During World War II, she went to work on the assembly line at an aviation plant.

Ben Hecht died in 1964, and Jenny Hecht died of an accidental drug overdose in 1971. Rose was living in Nyack, New York, where she died in March 1979.

Selected works 
Screenplays:

 Fingers at the Window (1942)
 Once in a Blue Moon (1936) (uncredited)
 Spring Tonic (1935) (uncredited)

Stage plays:

 Man-Eating Tiger
 All He Ever Loved
 Lentil

Novels:

 The Journey
 The Balcony

References 

1898 births
1979 deaths
20th-century American women writers
American women screenwriters
American people of Russian-Jewish descent
University of Chicago alumni
20th-century American screenwriters
Emigrants from the Russian Empire to the United States